Barth Falls, is a small waterfall located along the North Fork Klaskanine River in Clatsop County, Oregon. The waterfall is known for a three-step fish ladder that bypasses the waterfall to assist fish navigate the waterfall.

Location 
Barth Falls is located off of Highway 202 between Jewell and Astoria.

See also 
 List of waterfalls in Oregon

References 

Waterfalls of Oregon
Parks in Clatsop County, Oregon